In the music industry, a road manager is a person who works with small to mid-size tours (in terms of personnel involved, based on the size of the production). Job responsibilities include (but are not limited to):

advancing show dates
making travel and hotel arrangements (for all group members)
hiring backline techs or recommending techs to be hired (depending on authority given by artist management)
coordinating artist media obligations (normally while on tour, but could be anytime)
ensuring artist rider requirements are met
collecting payments due to the artist at showtime (or signing off on amount due to be sent via wire, depending on arrangements made by artist management)
making vendor payments (or submission of amounts due to vendors to artist management)
handling personnel issues
distributing per diem (depending on per diem schedule, approved by artist management)

Road managers can be confused with tour managers. Generally speaking, though, tour managers work with upper-mid to large scale tours and are often granted a much greater degree of authority in tour operations.

See also
Road crew
Body man

Occupations in music
Road crew
Concert tours